Katja Schweizer (born  as Katja Weisser) is a German curler and curling coach.

As a coach of German wheelchair curling team she participated in 2018 Winter Paralympics.

Teams

Women's

Mixed

Record as a coach of national teams

References

External links

Living people
1978 births
German female curlers
German curling coaches